"On My Way Here" is a song written by Ryan Tedder, Hunter Davis and Chris Faulk and is the title track for Clay Aiken's fourth album On My Way Here.

The song is about how the lessons we learn growing up shape us into the adults we become. This struck a chord with Aiken and the song became the inspiration for the album's theme. Aiken said "I thought if we could find songs along those lines, that deal with my life over the past five years and what I've learned from my experiences, it would be a great concept for an album."

Chart positions

In popular culture
"On My Way Here" is included on the Super Hero album commemorating the 2008 Beijing Olympics presented by MBA Sports.   The song was played in the background of several MBC-TV promos for Olympic programming in Korea. The Super Hero story is highlighted on the Korean website Yes24.com with "On My Way Here" playing in the background.

Discography
Clay Aiken discography

References

Clay Aiken songs
Songs written by Ryan Tedder
2008 songs